Sa. Kandasamy  (23 July 1940 – 31 July 2020) was a novelist and documentary film-maker from Mayiladuthurai in the Indian state of Tamil Nadu. He won the Sahitya Akademi Award in Tamil for his novel, Vicharanai Commission in 1998.

Life 
Kandasamy was born on 23 July 1940 in Mayiladuthurai, in the Indian state of Tamil Nadu. After studying at the Singaram Pillai School, he worked at the Chennai Port Trust and the Food Corporation of India.

Kandasamy later moved to Chennai, and joined a writers' group that included writer S. Ramakrishnan and artist R.B. Baskaran. They briefly published a literary magazine, Ka Sa Da Tha Pa Ra.

He died at the age of 80, after experiencing a heart attack.

Literary career 
Kandasamy's first novel was Saayavanam Puthinam, published in 1968. It was well-received and was later included by the National Book Trust as one of Indian literature's modern masterpieces. Saayavanam is one of the earliest examples of literature focusing on ecological concerns in India, and focuses on forest clearances and industrial development in Tamil Nadu. Kandasamy based on the novel on his own experiences in rural Tamil Nadu, and named the novel after a village that he had lived in with his family, as a child.

His novel, Vicharanai Commission, which dealt with custodial violence and the police, won the Sahitya Akademi Award for Tamil in 1998.

He has published seven novels and several collection of short stories, in Tamil.  One of Kandasamy's novels, Tholaindhu ponavargal was adapted for television.

In addition to fiction, Kandasamy wrote several pieces of criticism, focusing on visual arts and writing in Tamil Nadu, as well as introducing a series of Tamil biographies published by the Sahitya Akademi.

Film Making 
Kandasamy's documentary film, Kaval Deivangal, documented history and techniques relating to traditional terracotta art in South India. It won the first prize at the Angino Film Festival, in Cyprus, in 1989. In addition, Kandasamy also directed several other documentaries, primarily on popular Tamil writers and artists, including the sculptor S. Dhanapal, and writers Jayakanthan and Ashokamitran.

Publications

Novels 

 Saayavanam Puthinam
 Suriya Vamsam
 Visaranai Commission
 Avan Aanathu
 Tholaindhu Ponavargal (Those Who Are Lost)
 Perum Mazhai Natkal 
 Neelavan

Awards and honors 

 (1998) Sahitya Akademi Award - for his novel, Vicharanai Commission
 (1995) Lalit Kala Akademi Fellowship - for contributions to literature

References

External links

1940 births
2020 deaths
20th-century Indian novelists
Recipients of the Sahitya Akademi Award in Tamil
Novelists from Tamil Nadu
People from Mayiladuthurai district